Noy, or Loo, is a nearly extinct language of Chad.  In 1993 it had a population of 36 speakers, who lived in the Moyen-Chari and Mandoul regions, between Sarh, Djoli, Bédaya, Koumra, and Koumogo villages.  Speakers are shifting to Sar, the lingua franca of regional capital Sarh.

Further reading
 Palayer, Pierre. 1975. Note sur les noy du Moyen-Chari (Tchad). In Boyeldieu, Pascal and Palayer, Pierre (eds.), Les langues du groupe boua: études phonologiques, 196-219. N'Djamena: I.N.S.H.

References

Languages of Chad
Endangered Niger–Congo languages
Endangered languages of Africa
Bua languages